Bernardo Capó (20 October 1919 – 11 February 2000) was a Spanish racing cyclist. He rode in the 1949 Tour de France.

Major results

1945
 1st Stage 3a Circuito del Norte
 8th Overall Vuelta a España
1946
 1st Overall Vuelta a Burgos
1st Stage 3
 1st Overall Vuelta a Mallorca
 3rd Overall Volta a Catalunya
 3rd Road race, National Road Championships
1947
 1st  Road race, National Road Championships
 1st Overall Vuelta a Mallorca
 1st Stage 6 GP Marca
 2nd Circuito de Getxo
 3rd Overall Vuelta a Burgos
 3rd Trofeo Jaumendreu
 6th Trofeo Masferrer
 7th Overall Volta a Catalunya
1948
 1st Overall Volta a Tarragona
1st Stage 1
 2nd Overall Vuelta a Mallorca
 3rd Overall Vuelta a España
1949
 1st Stage 10 Volta a Catalunya
 1st Overall GP de Andalucia
1st Stage 1
 2nd Road race, National Road Championships
 2nd Trofeo Jaumendreu
 7th Trofeo Masferrer
1950
 1st Stage 6 Volta a Portugal
 4th Trofeo Masferrer
 7th Overall Vuelta a España
1st Stages 8a (ITT) & 21
1951
 1st Stage 4 Volta a Catalunya
1952
 2nd Trofeo Masferrer

References

External links
 

1919 births
2000 deaths
Spanish male cyclists
Sportspeople from Mallorca
Spanish Vuelta a España stage winners
Cyclists from the Balearic Islands